Wilson Jeremiah Moses (born 1942) is an African-American historian. He is Professor of American History at Pennsylvania State University.

Career
Wilson J. Moses obtained his A.B. and M.A. in British Literature at Wayne State University, and his Ph.D. in American Civilization at Brown University. He held the Walter L. Ferree professorship in the middle period of American History at Pennsylvania State University before that, and he currently is Professor Emeritus at Penn State. He has in the past held a series of posts at other American Universities:
Assistant Professor of History at the University of Iowa;
Associate Professor of History at Southern Methodist University;
Professor of Afro-American Studies and American Civilization at Brown University and
Professor of English and History and Director of African American Studies at Boston University.

He also has been a Visiting Professor at Harvard University, and given lectures at several European and African universities.

Major works
The Golden Age of Black Nationalism, 1850–1925, 1978; repr., Oxford University Press, 1988, 
Black Messiahs and Uncle Toms: Social and Literary Manipulations of a Religious Myth, 1982; Revised edition: Pennsylvania State Univ. Press, 1993, 
Alexander Crummell: A Study of Civilization and Discontent, Oxford University Press, 1989, 
The Wings of Ethiopia, Iowa State Univ. Press, 1990, 
Afrotopia: Roots of African-American Popular History, Cambridge University Press, 1998, 
Creative Conflict in African American Thought, Cambridge University Press, 2004, 
Thomas Jefferson: A Modern Prometheus, Cambridge University Press, 2019

References

Sources
 Contemporary Authors Online, Thomson Gale, 2004.
 Bernard E. Powers Jr., "Wilson Jeremiah Moses, Creative Conflict in African American Thought: Frederick Douglass, Alexander Crummell, Booker T. Washington, W.E.B. Du Bois, and Marcus Garvey". Cambridge, UK: Cambridge University Press, 2004.” in History of Intellectual Culture, 2007, Vol. 7, No. 1: 1–4.
 Robert S. Levine, "Elegant Inconsistencies: Race, Nation, and Writing Wilson Jeremiah Moses's Afrotopia" in American Literary History (2008) 20 (3): 497–507.
 Tommy Lott and John P. Pittman, eds., A Companion to African-American Philosophy. Malden MA: Blackwell Publishing, 2003. pp. 89–91

External links
Wilson J. Moses’ Blog,  including his Resume


1942 births
Living people
Pennsylvania State University faculty
Wayne State University alumni
Brown University alumni
University of Iowa faculty
Southern Methodist University faculty
Brown University faculty
Boston University faculty
Harvard University staff
African-American academics
21st-century American historians
21st-century American male writers
American male non-fiction writers
21st-century African-American writers
20th-century African-American people
African-American male writers